Brandon Nakashima defeated Marcos Giron in the final, 6–4, 6–4 to win the singles tennis title at the 2022 San Diego Open. It was his maiden ATP Tour title, and he won it in his hometown of San Diego.

Casper Ruud was the reigning champion, but competed at the Laver Cup instead.

Seeds
The top four seeds received a bye into the second round.

Draw

Finals

Top half

Bottom half

Qualifying

Seeds

Qualifiers

Qualifying draw

First qualifier

Second qualifier

Third qualifier

Fourth qualifier

References

External links
Main draw
Qualifying draw

San Diego Open